Hedqvist is a Swedish surname. People named Hedqvist include:

 Birger Hedqvist (1894–1964), officer
 Ivan Hedqvist (1880–1935), actor and director 
 Joakim Hedqvist (born 1977), bandy player
 Karl-Johan Hedqvist (1917–2009), entomologist
 Paul Hedqvist (1895–1977), architect 
 Paulina Hedqvist (born 1995), footballer

See also 
 Hedquist

Swedish-language surnames